Volker Anger (born 2 May 1968) is a German wrestler. He competed in the men's freestyle 48 kg at the 1988 Summer Olympics.

References

1968 births
Living people
German male sport wrestlers
Olympic wrestlers of East Germany
Wrestlers at the 1988 Summer Olympics
Sportspeople from Berlin